The 2018 Mountain West Conference football season, part of that year's NCAA Division I FBS football season, will be the 20th season of college football for the Mountain West Conference (MW). Since the 2012 12 teams have competed in the MW-football conference. The season will begin on August 25 and will end on November 24.  Mountain West is a "Group of Five" conference under the College Football Playoff format along with the American Athletic Conference, Conference USA, the Mid-American Conference, and the Sun Belt Conference. The Mountain West Championship Game will be played on December 1. The entire schedule was released on March 1.

Preseason

Mountain West Media 
2018 Mountain West media days took place on July 24 and 25 at the Cosmopolitan.

Preseason Polls

First place votes in parenthesis

Preseason All–Mountain West team

Preseason Offensive Player of the Year:
Brett Rypien, SR., QB, Boise State
Preseason Defensive Player of the Year:
Andrew Wingard, SR., DB, Wyoming
Preseason Special Teams Player of the Year:
Avery Williams, SO., KR/PR, Boise State

(* – member of the 2017 All–Mountain West first team)

(** – member of the 2017 All–Mountain West second team)

Coaches
NOTE: Stats shown are before the beginning of the season

Rankings

Listed are the Mountain West teams who were ranked or received votes at some point during the season. Air Force, Colorado State, Nevada, New Mexico, San Jose State, UNLV, and Wyoming were never ranked or received any votes.

Schedule

Regular season

Week Zero

Week One

Players of the week:

Boise State cornerback Tyler Horton was also named the Bronko Nagurski Trophy National Defensive Player of the Week.

Week Two

Players of the week:

Week Three

Players of the week:

Week Four

Players of the week:

Week Five

Players of the week:

Week Six

Players of the week:

Week Seven

Players of the week:

Week Eight

Players of the week:

Week Nine

Players of the week:

Week Ten

Players of the week:

Week Eleven

Players of the week:

Week Twelve

Players of the week:

Week Thirteen

Players of the week:

Mountain West Championship Game

Postseason

Bowl games

†The First Responder bowl was delayed and ultimately canceled with 5:08 remaining in the 1st quarter with Boston College leading 7–0. The game was ruled a no contest.

Records against FBS Conferences

Power Five conferences

Group of Five conferences

FCS Subdivision

Awards and honors

All Conference Teams

Offensive Player of the Year: Brett Rypien, Sr., QB, Boise State
Defensive Player of the Year: Jeff Allison, Jr., LB, Fresno State
Special Teams Player of the Year: Cooper Rothe, Jr., K, Wyoming
Freshman of the Year: Toa Taua, RB, Nevada
Coach of the Year: Matt Wells, Utah State

Offense:

Defense:

Honorable Mentions:
Air Force: Jeremy Fejedelem, Jr., DB.
Boise State: Durrant Miles, Sr., DL; Kekoa Nawahine, Jr., DB; Avery Williams, So, RS/DB.
Colorado State: None
Fresno State: Jaron Bryant, Jr., DB; Jasad Haynes, Jr, DL; George Helmuth, Sr., LB; Marcus McMaryion, Sr., QB.
Hawai'i: Zeno Choi, Sr., DL; Rojesterman Farris II, Jr.; DB; Cole McDonald, So., QB; Jahlani Tavai, Sr., LB; Solo Vaipulu, Fr., OL.
Nevada: Dameon Baber, Sr., DB; Daniel Brown, Jr., DB; Quinton Conaway, Jr., P; Sean Krepsz, Sr., OL; McLane Mannix, So., WR; Jake Nelson, Jr., OL Asauni Rufus, Sr., DB.
New Mexico: Aaron Blackwell, Jr., DL; Tyson Dyer, So., P; Marcus Hayes, Fr., DB.
San Diego State: Parker Baldwin, Sr., DB; Noble Hall, Sr., DL; Brandon Heicklen, Jr., P; Kahale Warring, Jr., TE; Juwan Washington, Jr., RB.
San Jose State: Ethan Aguayo, Jr., LB; Thai Cottrell, Sr., RS; Bryce Crawford, Sr., P; Boogie Roberts, Sr., DL.
UNLV: Nathan Jacobson, Sr., OL; Roger Mann, Sr., DL; Justin Polu, Jr., OL.
Utah State: Adewale Adeoye, Sr., DL; Rob Castaneda, Sr., OL; Dominik Eberle, Jr., PK; Gaje Ferguson, Sr., DB; Fua Leilua, Jr., DL; Dax Raymond, Jr., TE; Christopher Unga, Jr., DL; DJ Williams, Jr., DB. Ron’Quavion Tarver, Sr., WR; Sean Taylor, Sr., OL.
Wyoming: Tyler Hall, Jr., DB; Logan Wilson, Jr., LB.

Home game attendance

Bold – Exceed capacity
†Season High

References